Joseph Caldwell King (October 5, 1900 – January 27, 1977) was the Chief of the Western Hemisphere Division of the CIA in the 1950s and 1960s. He was also known by his CIA code name of Oliver G. Galbond and as Colonel J.C. King.

Early life and marriage
On October 5, 1900, Joseph Caldwell King was born to Warren Charles King and Jessie Calhoun Caldwell in Brooklyn, New York. King would go on to graduate from the U.S. Military Academy at West Point as part of the Class of 1923 and was assigned the Cullum Register Number 6992.

Joseph Caldwell King married twice: first to Cristina Patricia Pernas, then to Frances Anne Smith.

Career
King became a vice-president at Johnson and Johnson in charge of Brazil and Argentina. Then, he joined Nelson Rockefeller's Office of the Coordinator of Inter-American Affairs (OCIAA).

He was stationed in Argentina from 1941 to 1945, where he was engaged in feeding deceptive information to Japanese agents (see Thaddeus Holt, The Deceivers). For his service in 1943 to 1946 as a military attaché in Argentina, Lt. Col. King was awarded the Legion of Merit.

On December 11, 1959, King advocated that "thorough consideration" be given to the "elimination" of Fidel Castro, by which he may have meant assassination.

King officially retired from the CIA in 1967 but soon came back as a CIA consultant. He was CEO of the Amazon Natural Drug Company, known as a front for the CIA.

Later life
King's health began deteriorating because of age and Parkinson's disease, and he died on January 27, 1977, in Washington, D.C. However, King was buried at the United States Military Academy Post Cemetery in West Point, New York.

References

Further reading
Review by Bill Weinberg of book Thy Will Be Done by Gerard Colby with Charlotte Dennett
A. J. Weberman
Colby, Gerald with Dennett, Charlotte  Thy Will Be Done 1996 Harper Perennial

External links
Robert Van Dine "Brazil" article
Global Policy Forum article

1900 births
1977 deaths
American military officers
American spies
Burials at West Point Cemetery
Opposition to Fidel Castro
People of the Central Intelligence Agency
Recipients of the Legion of Merit
United States Military Academy alumni